The 2023 season will be the Denver Broncos' upcoming 54th season in the National Football League and their 64th overall. It will also be their third under the leadership of general manager George Paton, their second under the ownership of the Walton-Penner family group and their first under head coach Sean Payton. They will attempt to improve on their 5–12 record from last year, make the playoffs after a seven-year absence, and end their seven-year AFC West title drought.

Coaching changes
On February 3, Sean Payton was named as the 20th head coach in franchise history. Payton previously coached the New Orleans Saints from 2006–2021, with the exception of 2012, and the Broncos agreed to draft compensation with the Saints—see below. Payton will be the Broncos' seventh different head coach since 2008, and their third since 2018. He replaces Nathaniel Hackett, who was fired on December 22, and replaced by Jerry Rosburg on an interim basis for the last two games of the 2022 season.

Roster changes

Future contracts
All players listed below were signed to reserve/future contracts on January 9, unless otherwise noted. Each player was officially added to the active roster on March 15—the first day of the 2023 league year.

Free agents

Unrestricted

Note: Unrestricted free agents who were originally Restricted free agents (RFA) had three accrued seasons whose contracts expired at the end of the previous season, and did not receive a qualifying offer before the start of the 2023 league year on March 15.

Exclusive-rights

Signings

Departures

Draft 

Notes
 The Broncos traded their original first- and second-round selections (Nos. 5, and 37 overall, respectively), along with quarterback Drew Lock, tight end Noah Fant and defensive end Shelby Harris to the Seattle Seahawks in exchange for quarterback Russell Wilson and the Seahawks' 2022 fourth-round selection.
 The Broncos acquired a new first-round selection (No. 29 overall) as part of a trade that sent linebacker Bradley Chubb to the Miami Dolphins. The Broncos later traded this selection and a 2024 second-round selection to the New Orleans Saints as the compensation for the hiring of head coach  Sean Payton.
 The Broncos acquired an additional third-round selection (No. 67 overall) as part of a trade that sent their 2022 third-round selection to the Indianapolis Colts.
 The Broncos traded their original sixth-round selection (No. 183 overall), along with wide receiver Trinity Benson, to the Detroit Lions in exchange for the Lions' 2022 fifth- and seventh-round selections.
 The Broncos acquired a new sixth-round selection (No. 195 overall) in a trade that sent a seventh-round selection (No. 241 overall—previously acquired in a trade with the Minnesota Vikings) and linebacker Malik Reed to the Pittsburgh Steelers.
 The Broncos traded their original seventh-round selection (No. 222 overall), along with a 2022 sixth-round selection, to the San Francisco 49ers in exchange for linebacker Jonas Griffith and a 2022 seventh-round selection.

Staff

Current roster

Preseason
The Broncos' preseason opponents and schedule will be announced in the spring.

Regular season

2023 opponents
Listed below are the Broncos' opponents for 2023. Exact dates and times will be announced in the spring.

References

External links
 
 Denver Broncos news, analysis, roster, stats — The Denver Post 
 NFL Nation Blog – ESPN

Denver
Denver Broncos seasons
Denver Broncos